New Taipei City Constituency VIII includes most of Zhonghe in New Taipei City. The district was formerly known as Taipei County Constituency VIII (2008-2010) and was created in 2008, when all local constituencies of the Legislative Yuan were reorganized to become single-member districts.

Current district
 Zhonghe: 
 Villages:Lixing(力行里), Zhongshan(中山里), Zhongzheng(中正里), Zhongyuan(中原里), Zhongxing(中興里)Renhe(仁和里), Neinan(內南里), Wenyuan(文元里), Wainan(外南里), Pinghe(平和里)Zhengxing(正行里), Zhengnan(正南里), Minsheng(民生里), Min'an(民安里), Minyou(民有里)Minxiang(民享里), Wayao(瓦磘里), Jixing(吉興里), Ansui(安穗里)Huiyao(灰磘里), Ziqiang(自強里), Jiahe(佳和里), Hexing(和興里), Zhongxiao(忠孝里), Mingde(明德里), Mingsui(明穗里)Fangliao(枋寮里), Dongnan(東南里), Xinhe(信和里), Guande(冠穗里), Nanshan(南山里), Jianhe(建和里)Yuanshan(員山里), Yuanfu(員富里), Guoguang(國光里), Guohua(國華里), Chongnan(崇南里), Qingsui(清穗里)Lianhe(連和里), Liancheng(連城里), Dingnan(頂南里), Fuxing(復興里), Jingwen(景文里), Jingping(景平里)Jingben(景本里), Jing'an(景安里), Jingnan(景南里), Jingxin(景新里), Jingfu(景福里), Huanan(華南里)Huaxin(華新里), Xinnan(新南里), Ruisui(瑞穗里), Jiaxing(嘉新里), Jiaqing(嘉慶里), Jiasui(嘉穗里)Shounan(壽南里), Shoude(壽德里), Zhanghe(漳和里), Bihe(碧河里), Fuhe(福和里), Funan(福南里)Fumei(福美里), Fuzhen(福真里), Fuxiang(福祥里), Fushan(福善里), Miaomei(廟美里), Dexing(德行里)Desui(德穗里), Henglu(橫路里), Jisui(積穗里), Xingnan(興南里), Jinzhong(錦中里), Jinhe(錦和里), Jinchang(錦昌里), Jinsheng(錦盛里)

Legislators

Election results

 

 
 
 
 
 
 
 
 
 
 

2008 establishments in Taiwan
Constituencies in New Taipei